Mou is a town in the Oury Department of Balé Province in southern Burkina Faso. In 1996, the town had a population of 1,308.

References

Populated places in the Boucle du Mouhoun Region